The Glitterhouse is the sole studio album by English post-punk band Medium Medium, was released in 1981 by record label Cherry Red.

Reception 

Trouser Press' review was negative, opining that it "uses too much aural gimmickry and tends to meander aimlessly".

References

External links 

 

1981 albums
Medium Medium albums